Irving Grant Thalberg Jr. (August 25, 1930August 21, 1987) was an author and the son of 1930s Hollywood producer Irving Thalberg and Academy Award-winning actress Norma Shearer.

Thalberg was six years old when his father died from pneumonia at the age of 37. He was educated at Institut Le Rosey in Switzerland and attended Stanford University. He was a professor of philosophy at the University of Illinois at Chicago until he died of cancer on August 21, 1987, four days before his 57th birthday. He left a wife and three daughters. Prior to the University of Illinois, he was briefly a professor at the University of Washington.

Publications
Thalberg published two books of philosophical studies through the Muirhead Library of Philosophy:  Enigmas of Agency (Allen & Unwin, London, 1972), and Perception, Emotion & Action (Blackwells, Oxford, 1977).

Unlike most epistemologists, Thalberg published articles that defended the Platonic tripartite analysis of knowledge (justified true belief, a.k.a. "JTB") against the more popular view that Gettier counterexamples refuted the JTB account.  Specifically, Thalberg argued that justification is not transmissible through valid deduction.

See also
American philosophy
List of American philosophers

References

External links

 

1930 births
1987 deaths
Alumni of Institut Le Rosey
American people of German-Jewish descent
Jewish philosophers
People from Los Angeles
University of Illinois Chicago faculty
Deaths from cancer in Illinois
20th-century American philosophers